Ballıca is a village in Tarsus district of Mersin Province, Turkey. It is situated in the plains of Çukurova (Cilicia of the antiquity). The population of Ballıca was 170 as of 2011. There are tumuli of ancient ages around the village, but the modern village was founded in 1730 by Yörüks (once-nomadic Turkmens). During the brief occupation by Ibrahim Pasha of Egypt in the 19th century, cotton farming was introduced to village. After the village was returned to the Ottoman Empire, Turkmens from Elazığ were settled in the village to work in cotton fields. After irrigation facilities were improved during the republican era after 1923, cotton production increased.

References

Villages in Tarsus District